Willy Debosscher (born 14 February 1943) is a former Belgian cyclist. He competed in the team pursuit at the 1968 Summer Olympics.

References

External links
 

1943 births
Living people
Belgian male cyclists
Olympic cyclists of Belgium
Cyclists at the 1968 Summer Olympics
People from Merelbeke
Cyclists from East Flanders